Charizard, known in Japan as , is a Pokémon in Nintendo and Game Freak's Pokémon franchise. Created by Atsuko Nishida, Charizard first appeared in the video games Pokémon Red and Blue (Pokémon Red and Green in Japan) and subsequent sequels. They have later appeared in various merchandise, spinoff titles and animated and printed adaptations of the franchise. It is known as the Flame Pokémon. Shin-ichiro Miki, the actor who voices James in the original Japanese version of the Pokémon anime, voices Charizard in both the Japanese and English-language versions of the anime. An orange, draconic Pokémon, Charizard is the evolved form of Charmeleon and the final evolution of Charmander. It also has two Mega Evolved forms, Mega Charizard X and Y, that were likely both designed by Tomohiro Kitakaze, the designer of Mega Charizard X, and are not permanent and always revert to the normal Charizard form once a battle is complete.  It also has a Gigantamax form in Pokémon Sword and Shield, which changes its appearance and size for 3 turns, until it is knocked out, until it is returned, or until the battle ends.

Charizard is featured in the Pokémon anime series with the most recurring being from the main character Ash Ketchum. It is featured in printed adaptations such as Pokémon Adventures, in the possession of Blue, one of the main characters. Charizard appears in Pokémon Origins with main character Red as its trainer. In this series, Charizard is iconic, because it was the first Pokémon to Mega Evolve into Mega Charizard X and it helped beat Mewtwo. Charizard has received positive reception from the media, with GamesRadar describing it as "hands-down one of the coolest Pokémon out there". Charizard is the version mascot of Pokémon Red and FireRed versions, and makes an appearance on the boxarts of Pokémon Stadium, Pokémon Ranger, Pokémon Mystery Dungeon: Red Rescue Team, Pokémon Mystery Dungeon: Explorers of Sky, and Pokémon Super Mystery Dungeon. It has appeared in every entry of the Super Smash Bros. series, in an unplayable capacity in the first two games before becoming a playable character from Super Smash Bros. Brawl onwards. A Charizard also appears in the live-action animated film Detective Pikachu.

Concept and characteristics

Conception 
Charizard was designed by Atsuko Nishida for the first generation of Pocket Monsters games Red and Green, which were localized outside Japan as Pokémon Red and Blue. Charizard was designed before Charmander, the latter being actually based on the former. Originally called "Lizardon" in Japanese, Nintendo decided to give the various Pokémon species "clever and descriptive names" related to their appearance or features when translating the game for western audiences as a means to make the characters more relatable to American children. As a result, they were renamed "Charizard", a portmanteau of the words "charcoal" or "char" and "lizard". During an interview, Pokémon Company 
President Tsunekazu Ishihara stated that Charizard was expected to be popular with North American audiences because of their preference for strong, powerful characters.

Physical information 
Whereas its pre-evolutions Charmander and Charmeleon are ground-bound lizard like creatures, Charizard's design is inspired by dragons, more specifically European dragons. Even though Charizard gains the Flying secondary type instead of the Dragon type upon evolving, it belongs to the Dragon Egg Group, learns Dragon moves like Dragon Claw, and has its Flying type replaced by Dragon in its "Mega Charizard X" form.

Charizard has two teal wings, with a mostly orange body and back. Its plantigrade feet have the bottom mostly covered by a single pad that is cream-colored like its large belly, while its eyes are light blue in color. When Charizard is Mega Evolved, it can take on one of two forms. Both forms are characterized by white pupils, bigger and sharper teeth, claws and horns and the bright coloring of the belly reaching the whole bottom of the muzzle, which also features a more pronounced snout. In its "X" form, its color scheme changes from orange and cream to black and blue, with red eyes, two claws appearing on each shoulder and wings acquiring a multilobed, feather-like structure. The flame at the tip of its tail becomes blue and blue flames are constantly breathed out from the sides of its mouth. In its "Y" form, its appearance is influenced by that of Pteranodons, with a central big pointed horn, loss of fingers passing through the patagia of the main wings that increase in size, smaller wings stemming from Pteranodon-like hands. It also gains a more slender appearance with a thinner torso, a longer tail and digitigrade feet that are longer and devoid of pads.

The video games describe Charizard as having wings that can carry them close to an altitude of 4,600 feet (1,400 m), flying proudly around the sky and constantly seeking for powerful opponents to battle with. They can breathe intense flames that can melt any material, but will never torch a weaker foe. If Charizard becomes angry, the flame at the tip of their tail can flare up in a whitish-blue color. Because of their reckless behavior, Charizard are known to unintentionally cause wildfires. While Mega Charizard X is known for its black, toned body, hotter blue flames as well as its Dragon type, Mega Charizard Y is generally regarded for its flying prowess, with it allegedly being able to reach up to 10,000 meters of altitude while flying. In Pokémon Go, Charizard exists in two forms, its original form with orange body and a cream-coloured patch on its belly, and its shiny form, which is a gray body with the same cream-coloured patch on its belly. Charizard's shiny form first made its appearance in Pokémon Gold and Silver, during Pokémon Go Community Day event featuring Charmander. During the Community Day event, shiny Charmander may be encountered, which can be evolved into a shiny Charmeleon, and in turn, evolved into a shiny Charizard. In Generation VIII, Charizard is capable of Gigantamaxing, a special type of Dynamaxing wherein it completely changes Charizard's form. When Gigantamaxed, Charizard's belly is all lit up, its wings are cloaked in fire, and its tail flame has grown as well. If Charizard knows any Fire-type damage dealing moves, they will be transformed into G-Max Wildfire, which deals damage for five turns. Gigantamax Charizard is best seen during battles with Galarian Champion Leon. The player can also get a Gigantamax Charizard by obtaining a Charmander in a Poke Ball in Leon's house (the Poke Ball is located in his bedroom) and evolving it into Charizard.

Competitive battling 

From its release in the first generation to the fifth generation, Charizard failed to make a major impact on the competitive scene, to the point where it "wasn't seen in serious competitive play" and was "doomed ... to be forgotten". This relative lack of viability, combined with its relentless popularity, gave it an unfavorable "reputation of a Pokémon that represents the fanboys". In VGC (Video Game Championship) the official competitive format for Pokémon is a doubles format that started in Generation IV, and Charizard did not start to have much presence until it gained its Mega Charizard Y form in 2014 and 2015 where its ability Drought set up sun which could support its team members by activating abilities like Solar Power and Chlorophyll and halving damage from water attacks whilst also boosting its already powerful Fire-Type moves, while also allowing it to use the move Solar Beam in one turn, when it normally took two, it could also help its team even more with Tailwind. However, in 2016 it fell from usage as Primal Groudon outclassed it as a sun setter and fire type. In 2017 mega evolutions weren't allowed and in 2018 it again had lots of usage until Primal Groudon outclassed it again in 2019. In 2020 mega evolution was not present in the newest games, Pokémon Sword and Shield, and so far it has been phenomenal with its incredible Gigantamax form with the move G-max Wildfire which gives it a really strong damaging effect, even winning the Dallas Regionals. It got even better with its hidden ability being allowed with its Gigantamax form making it do 50% more damage when sun is up which is easier with Torkoal to make Charizard do more damage. Mega Charizard X hasn't been nearly as good in VGC over the years with its ability being less useful and being weak to the common ability Intimidate however it has still seen some success with people like Jamie Boyt winning a regional with this. In singles, it periodically found niches, such as with the boosting move Belly Drum, but it was crippled by the fourth generation's entry hazard Stealth Rock, which removed half of its health upon entering the battle while active. The sixth generation rescued Charizard's competitive status by introducing its Mega Charizard X and Mega Charizard Y forms, transforming it into a "top-level threat" of Smogon's standard tier. With the release of Generation VIII and Pokemon Sword and Shield in 2019, Charizard gained more popularity with the new item "Heavy-Duty Boots", which negated the effects of Stealth Rock, it's previously mentioned major issue.

Appearances

In video games
Charizard made its video game debut in 1996 with the Japanese release of Pokémon Red and Blue. It is available only through Pokémon evolution from the starter Pokémon Charmander. In Pokémon Gold, Silver, and Crystal, and their remakes Pokémon HeartGold and SoulSilver, Charizard is used by Red, who acts as the games' final boss. Charizard is one of several Pokémon in Pokémon X and Y that is able to use the new Mega Evolution mechanic, becoming either Mega Charizard X or Mega Charizard Y. It was given a Mega Evolution about one and a half years into the development of Pokémon X and Y. Charmander (along with Bulbasaur and Squirtle) was added to the game in a significant role in order to allow players to experience Charizard's Mega Evolution. It is also able to have a new form Pokémon Sword and Shield called a Gigantamax form. Champion Leon has it as his main Pokémon in these games as well.

Charizard has made appearances in many other Pokémon games. It appears in Pokémon Mystery Dungeon: Blue Rescue Team and Red Rescue Team on a team with an Alakazam and Tyranitar, who play a significant role in the story. In Pokémon Ranger, Charizard is a boss Pokémon who becomes attached to the player's character and assists him or her throughout the game. Charizard returns in Pokémon Ranger: Guardian Signs as another boss character, and Pokémon Rumble. It is also one of the photographable Pokémon in Pokémon Snap, as well as a non-playable character in PokéPark Wii: Pikachu's Adventure and its sequel, PokéPark 2: Wonders Beyond.

Charizard has appeared many times throughout the Super Smash Bros. series. Charizard first appears as a non-playable character in Super Smash Bros. and Super Smash Bros. Melee, as one of the Pokémon which can appear if a player throws a Poké Ball. In Super Smash Bros. Brawl, Charizard is playable while under the command of the Pokémon Trainer. The Trainer has a Squirtle and an Ivysaur, all three of which can be switched between; unlike the other fighters, these Pokémon become fatigued and consequently weaker, and must be switched out long enough in order to recover. Charizard's moves include Rock Smash, Flamethrower, and Fly. Charizard is playable as a standalone character in Super Smash Bros. for Nintendo 3DS and Wii U, where it gains the move Flare Blitz and its new Final Smash is transforming into Mega Charizard X. Charizard returns in Super Smash Bros. Ultimate, where it is once again under the command of the Pokémon Trainer alongside Squirtle and Ivysaur. Charizard also appears as a playable fighter in Pokkén Tournament and Pokémon Unite.

In anime
In the anime, the most notable Charizard is one Ash Ketchum has had since he was a Charmander abandoned by his former owner Damian. Ash's Charmander evolved into Charmeleon after a battle against an army of Exeggutor, and his personality changed completely, becoming a disobedient and prideful Pokémon and fighting when and how he pleased. Charmeleon evolved when Ash summoned him for protection from wild prehistoric Pokémon; when an Aerodactyl attacked him and carried Ash off, Charmeleon evolved to fight the Aerodactyl and rescue Ash. Charizard still disobeyed Ash, preferring to sleep, and only battled Pokémon that would pose a challenge, but Charizard helped Ash reach his goals, particularly against Gym Leader Blaine. Charizard's disobedience to Ash cost him the Indigo League because Charizard chose to sleep instead of fighting.

Charizard became loyal during the Orange Islands arc after Ash battled a trainer with a Poliwrath and Charizard was frozen solid. Because Ash helped Charizard thaw out, he began to obey Ash and defeated the Poliwrath in a rematch. He remained on Ash's team and contributed to his wins in the Orange League and parts of Johto. He eventually stayed behind in the Charizific Valley, a reserve where wild Charizard battle and train to become stronger. This was likely due to meeting Charla, a female Charizard for whom he developed a fondness.

Charizard, like some of Ash's other Pokémon, returns on a temporary basis to battle at Ash's side, typically when Ash faces a particularly powerful Pokémon. Charizard has saved Ash's life on more than one occasion, as seen in the film Spell of the Unown, where he battled against Entei after arriving in the nick of time to prevent Ash and Pikachu from falling to their deaths, having flown over from the Charizific Valley after originally seeing a live broadcast of Ash running after Entei who had kidnapped Ash's mother, Delia Ketchum. Charizard returned during the Johto Pokémon League and defeated Gary's Blastoise, who had a type advantage over Charizard. Charizard also returned for Ash's first Battle Frontier battle, where he took on Articuno at the Battle Factory and won thanks to an unorthodox strategy.

During the Best Wishes series, Charizard officially rejoined Ash's team (replacing Ash's Unfezant, who was sent to Professor Oak's Lab in the process), while Ash was exploring Unova. Upon meeting Ash again, he gave his trainer a Flamethrower to the face much to everyone's surprise. Charizard also developed a fierce rivalry with Iris's Dragonite so much so that both Ash and Iris agreed to have a battle. During the battle which originally began on the ground but later ascended skywards when both Pokémon took to the skies, it was shown that Charizard had learnt Wing Attack, Slash, and Dragon Tail but despite the two Pokémon having something of a very fierce rivalry with one another, N immediately called the battle off after realizing that Dragonite had injured its right arm. Charizard stayed with all of Ash's Pokémon sans Pikachu at Professor Oak's laboratory when Ash leaves Kanto once more for the faraway Kalos region.

In Generation VIII, Charizard is capable of Gigantamaxing, a special type of Dynamaxing wherein it completely changes Charizard's form. When Gigantamaxed, Charizard's belly is all lit up, its wings are cloaked in fire, and its tail flame has grown as well. If Charizard knows any Fire-type damage-dealing moves, they will be transformed into G-Max Wildfire, which deals damage for five turns. Gigantamax Charizard is best seen during battles with Galarian Champion Leon.

In printed adaptations
In Pokémon: Pikachu Shocks Back, which loosely parallels the storyline of the anime, Ash catches a Charmander, and it ultimately becomes a Charizard and battles in the Pokémon League tournament. Despite his catch, he has trouble controlling it. Ash brings Charizard to the Orange Islands and trains it diligently since the near-disaster. He then uses it to battle Dragonite in the final showdown with the Orange Crew Supreme gym leader Drake.

In the Pokémon Adventures manga, Blue receives a Charmander from his grandfather Professor Oak. It evolves into a Charmeleon, and when Blue is possessed by a Gastly in the Lavender Tower, so is Charmeleon. Blue's Charmeleon is eventually released from its possession only to be faced down by an Arbok, owned by Koga. Charmeleon tricked Koga by using a zombie Psyduck to deflect Arbok's Acid before literally slicing the Arbok in half with his tail. Blue later appears with an evolved Charizard and gains access to Saffron City by helping to disable a barrier created by a Mr. Mime. Later, Red and Blue face off against Koga's Articuno and are frozen by its Ice Beam, but they ultimately defeat the Team Rocket Executive with Charizard's Flamethrower. It then teams up with Red's newly evolved Venusaur, Saur, and Green's Blastoise, Blasty, to defeat Sabrina's monster Pokémon. They end Team Rocket's control of Saffron City, splitting apart the three birds in the process.

Blue's Charizard re-appeared during the final match of the ninth Pokémon League, against his longtime rival Red. Despite the type advantage, Charizard battles against Saur and is nearly knocked out. As the battle progresses the two trainers send out their first Pokémon to battle again, when Saur binds Charizard from attacking. Suddenly, thunderclouds form from the attacks of Poli and Pika, and Saur submerges a vine into the cloud, shocking Charizard and knocking it out. When the "FireRed and LeafGreen" volume of the manga began the original protagonists – Red, Blue, and Green – return to fight the newly formed Team Rocket and the Deoxys under their power. The three trainers become trapped inside the Trainer Tower in the Sevii Islands, battling the main computer of the building and the Deoxys Divides. After struggling to co-ordinate Blasty, Saur, and Charizard, the three trainers manage to focus the angle of the three powerful attacks – Blast Burn, Hydro Cannon, and Frenzy Plant – to free Mewtwo, who in turn destroys the Trainer Tower.

Charizard appeared as the main Pokémon in the short novel, Charizard Go! Adapted by Tracey West, the novelization retells Ash's journey with his Charmander, and it reaches its climax as Ash and Charizard battle in the Pokémon League at the Indigo Plateau against his good friend Ritchie. The story covers Ash and his companions finding the abandoned Charmander, the battles in which Charmeleon did not listen to Ash, and Charizard's battle against Blaine's Magmar. Charizard Go! is the sixth novel in the Pokémon Chapter Books series. Another chapter novel, All Fired Up: Pokémon the Johto Journeys, adapted by Jennifer Johnson, covers the portion of Ash's journey near Violet City and the Characific Valley. In the novel, Ash wonders if Charizard should leave his team forever; it covers the capture of Ash's Cyndaquil, his new fire Pokémon.

Reception
Charizard has been featured in lines of soft toys and action figures in the Pokémon franchise, made by Hasbro, and Tomy. In 2004, the "Charizard Medium Plush" was part of a major recall of 13 plush toys due to a manufacturing fault where tips of needles were being found with the stuffing. This allowed Tomy to replace the toys with compensation or replacements. Charizard appears often in the Pokémon Trading Card Game, most notably in the series' initial release. Cards featuring the character have been stated to be the most desired of the series, quickly rising to high prices amongst collectors and retailers. In 2005, search engine Yahoo! reported Charizard as "one of the top Pokémon-related web searches". David Caballero of Screen Rant listed Charizard as the best Ash Ketchum's Pokémon from each region. Kevin Slackie of Paste listed Charizard as fourth of the best Pokemon, and further stated that Charizard may seem like a giant scary dragon, but for many people this was the first Pokémon they ever fell in love with. Dale Bishir of IGN described Charizard as the most important Pokémon that impacted the franchise's history, and further stated that Charizard has fared well in the past 25 years, having appearances in the anime, playable appearances in three different Smash games, and even having all kinds of forms, from Gigantamax to Mega Evolution. Steven Bogos of The Escapist listed Charizard as second of their favorite Pokémon, describing it as "awesome across  of the franchise's properties".

Described by the media as "a lean, ferocious, fire-breathing dragon ... sleek, powerful, and utterly destructive", Charizard has been noted as one of the franchise's "most popular" characters. Retailers have attributed the high sales of merchandise related to the character to the popularity of the character's dragon-like design with children. Interviewed children have stated similar; they attributed its appeal to its "cool looking" appearance and associating the character with the "concepts of stubbornness and power". The book Rebuilding Attachments With Traumatized Children stated psychiatrists utilized the character as an empowered character traumatized children who were fans of the Pokémon series could relate to. The book Pikachu's Global Adventure: The Rise and Fall of Pokémon cited Charizard as "popular" with older male children who tend to be drawn to "tough or scary" characters, and compared the character's evolution from Charmander into Charizard with the loss of "cuteness" as one leaves childhood.

IGN editor "Pokémon of the Day Chick" called Charizard "certainly the most popular and perhaps the most well-balanced of any of the current starting Pokemon". GamesRadars Brett Elston described Charizard as "hands-down one of the coolest Pokémon out there", heavily praising its character design and calling it "one of the coolest" designs of the entire series. GamesRadar editor Raymond Padilla stated "Charizard was an awesome Pokemon back in the day and still an excellent choice more than a decade after it was introduced." UGO.com described Charizard as a "winged, dragon-like creature" which is "able to breathe fire and smash opponents into red-tinged goo", but states that in Brawl, it is "as slow as Bowser" and "lacks the coolness factor of Mario's arch-nemesis". Ben Skipper of the International Business Times praised the designs of Charizard, and calling it a great design, but not good as Blastoise. Charizard was ranked 19th in Complexs "The 50 Best Pokemon Up to Pokemon Crystal", with Elijah Watson saying that Charizard is one of the best out there. IGN readers voted Charizard as one of the best pocket monster, receiving 86.3% of win percentage.

Authors Tracey West and Katherine Noll called Charizard the "best Fire type Pokémon" and the "third best Pokémon overall". They wrote that "there was nothing else that could better fit that spot" and that "it has won [their] hearts and had [them] cheering for more." 1UP editor Kat Bailey expressed concern about which Pokémon could follow the player in Pokémon HeartGold and SoulSilver, stating "allowing popular favorites like Charizard would go over quite well". The Daily Cardinal editor Kyle Sparks called Charizard "the most dominant Pokémon in the whole universe, a force of sheer strength". In a poll conducted by IGN, it was voted as the "best Pokémon", where the staff commented about remembering being torn between choosing Blastoise and Charizard at the start of the game. In a poll by Official Nintendo Magazine, Charizard was voted as the "best Fire-type Pokémon". They stated, "not only is Charizard your favourite fire Pokémon, but it is probably one of the most popular 'mon of all time". Kotaku editor Patricia Hernandez criticized Charizard's Y Mega Evolution for not differing enough from Charizard's original design, while praising Mega Charizard X for changing color, and turning Charizard into a dragon-type. Game Informer ranked Charizard as the "coolest Pokémon out of the original 151", describing it as "Powerful, gigantic, and imposing". They further commented that "Pikachu may be the one you recognize, but Charizard is the one you want." Laura Gray of Screen Rant stated that Charizard was too overrated on franchise, and has created problems from fans, the popularity also prevents other Pokémon from having a chance at the spotlight.

Charizard has always been a popular character amongst Pokémon card collectors. According to eBay, Charizard's Pokémon card is the one that is sold mostly, especially when a 1999 base 1st-edition holographic shadowless stamp of Charizard was sold for $350,100. In October 2020, popular YouTuber and influencer Logan Paul purchased a base set Charizard card for $150,000. Later in December 2020, another base set Charizard card sold for a record $369,000. In 2021, A rare, non-official card called "thicc Charizard" was sold as an NFT for over $30,000.

References

External links

 
 Charizard on Pokemon.com

Dragon characters in video games
Fictional dragons 
Pokémon species
Super Smash Bros. fighters
Video game characters introduced in 1996
Video game characters with air or wind abilities
Video game characters with fire or heat abilities
Fictional characters who can change size
Video game mascots
Nintendo protagonists

ca:Línia evolutiva de Charmander#Charizard
cs:Seznam pokémonů (1-20)#Charizard
da:Pokémon (1-20)#Charizard
fr:Salamèche et ses évolutions#Dracaufeu
pl:Lista Pokémonów (1-20)#Charizard